The sulphur-breasted parakeet (Aratinga maculata), or sulphur-breasted conure is a species of parrot from Brazil and Suriname. It resembles the closely related sun parakeet.

Taxonomy
First described in 1776, A. maculata had long been dismissed as invalid. It was rediscovered as part of a study of specimens of the sun parakeet and related species. Specimens of the sulphur-breasted parakeet had previously been dismissed as immature sun parakeets or hybrids. Believing it represented an entirely undescribed species, it was described as A. pintoi (in honour of the Brazilian ornithologist Olivério Pinto) in 2005. Only in 2009 was it shown that A. maculata and the "new" A. pintoi were the same.

Some believe the sulphur-breasted parakeet is better regarded as a subspecies of the sun parakeet.

Distribution and appearance
Following the realisation that the sulphur-breasted parakeet was a valid species, the first records of living birds were from east of Óbidos on the northern bank of the lower Amazon River in Pará, Brazil. Since then, it has been reported more widely at low densities in the Pará state north of the Amazon River, but still no records have been reported from neighbouring parts of Amapá, where it probably also occurs. Additionally, three specimens kept at the National Museum of Natural History in the Netherlands have been identified as this species. They were taken from the Sipaliwini Savanna in southern Suriname. Recent sightings from the same region have also been identified as sulphur-breasted parakeets. This suggests that it possibly comes into contact with the closely related and very similar sun parakeet. Unlike adult sun parakeets, sulphur-breasted parakeets have clear green suffusion to the mantle, wing-coverts and underparts, but this is shared with juvenile sun parakeets. Adults of both species have a dark greyish eye ring in the wild, but this commonly fades to whitish in captives, at least in the sun parakeet (this is the source of the mistaken idea that the colour of the eye ring separates the two).

References

External links
BirdLife International (2005). Parrot that eluded ornithologists for a century.

sulphur-breasted parakeet
Birds of the Guianas
Birds of the Amazon Basin
sulphur-breasted parakeet
sulphur-breasted parakeet